The 1913 Navy Midshipmen football team represented the United States Naval Academy during the 1913 college football season. In their third season under head coach Douglas Legate Howard, the team compiled a  record, shut out seven opponents, and defeated its opponents by a combined score of 304 to 29.

The team's sole loss came in the annual Army–Navy Game, played on November 29 at the Polo Grounds in New York City; Army won

Schedule

References

Navy
Navy Midshipmen football seasons
Navy Midshipmen football